Chirilov is a Romanian-language surname, derived from Chiril:

Călin Chirilov, a Moldovan footballer
Florina Chirilov, a Romanian female volleyball player, member of Romania women's national volleyball team
Mihai Cristian Chirilov, a Romanian film critic
Sergiu (Serghei) Chirilov, a Moldovan football manager, futsalist and former professional footballer

See also
Chiril (name)
Chirilovca (disambiguation)
Kirilov
Kirillov (surname)

Romanian-language surnames